Mohammad Amir Ahmed Khan , titled as the Raja of Mahmudabad (5 November 1914 – 14 October 1973)  was a prominent politician and leader of the All India Muslim League, during the Pakistan Movement.

He served as Managing Trustee from 1940–1944 of Madrasatul Waizeen, a centre of Shia Islamic education founded by his father located in Lucknow.

Titles and honours 
Khan Bahadur Khan
Amirul Omara
Saeedul Mulk Muzzafar Jung Ghanzanfaru-daula

Literary and cultural aspects 
He carried on the family tradition and was an accomplished poet in Urdu and Persian. He composed a number of ruba'iyat, salaams, and marsiya as well as some ghazals and nazms under the takhalus (nom de plume) of 'Bahr' and 'Mahbub'. One of his previously unpublished marsiya, entitled Jawn Martyr of Karbala Lamented, has been recently published in London.

Inheritance and legacy 
He inherited the Estate of Mahamudabad  in 1931 upon death of his father Maharaja Sir Mohammad Ali Mohammad Khan. After his demise, his Estate was taken over by the Government of India under 'Enemy Properties Act'. His wife Rani Kaniz Abid and his only son and heir Raja Mohammad Amir Mohammad Khan remained an Indian citizen and fought a case for recovery of their ancestral Estate for reclaiming their heritage worth millions of rupees and the case is, at present, in high profile legal dispute in India. He won the case after 37 herculean years winning through district court, High Court of Bombay, and the Supreme Court of India which gave a landmark judgement in 2005 ordering "vacant possession" to his properties.  Yet to date, the order is far from implementation as the Indian Government continues to bring emergency ordinances in order to block the Supreme Court order; so the case is back in the courts.

Pakistan Movement 
He was one of the youngest members of Working Committee of All India Muslim League in 1937. In the same year 1937, he founded All India Muslim Students Federation, which later mobilized into a strong vocal support for Pakistan Movement. However, he was against the partition of India. When the Muslim League passed the resolution at Lahore, he supported the creation of Pakistan. 

Later on, he changed his mind under the influence of Muhammad Ali Jinnah, who was a long time family friend and eventually supported the idea of a separate Muslim state. Maharaja Mohammad Ali Mohammad Khan had created a trust with Motilal Nehru, Mohammad Ali Jinnah, Deputy Habibullah and Chaudhary Bam Bahadur Shah amongst others to administer the estate as his son was still a minor. Motilal Nehru died before the Maharaja and after the latter's death in 1931, Mohammad Ali Jinnah became the dominant personality on the board. He said that "...the idea of a separate Muslim state in India stirred the imagination of the Muslims as nothing else had done before."

Migration 
In 1945, before the Independence of India, he migrated to Iraq. He subsequently moved to Pakistan in 1957. He later settled down in London.

Life in London 
He was the first Director of the Islamic Cultural Centre in London, and devoted rest of his life in supervising the building of the Regent Park Mosque. He was the moving force behind the World of Islam Festival  held in 1976 in the United Kingdom. Ali Allawi reminisces about the events of 1976.

Death
He died in London on 14 October 1973 but was buried in Mashhad in Iran. He is survived by his two daughters, Bari Rajkumari Ammatul Hussein Imam and Choti Rajkumari Rabab Mehdi, and was succeeded by his son Raja Mohammad Amir Mohammad Khan who has been a Member of the Legislative Assembly of Uttar Pradesh.

Legacy
The Mehmoodabad area of Karachi is named after him. Raja Sahib of Mahmudabad used to practice strict self-denial and self-discipline for religious reasons in his personal life. That is why his house in Karbala, Iraq and all his wealth was gifted to the Government of Pakistan.

In 1990, Pakistan Postal Services issued a commemorative postage stamp in his honor in its 'Pioneers of Freedom' series.

Further reading 
Syed Ishtiaq Husain. Glimpses of Freedom Movement: The Life and the Times of Raja Saheb of Mahmudabad. Mehboob Academy, Karachi (1990)
Khwaja Razi Haider. Raja Sahib Mahmoodabad: Hayat-o-Khidmaat. Quaid-i-Azam Academy, Karachi

References

1914 births
1973 deaths
All India Muslim League members
Indian royalty
Iraqi people of Indian descent
Leaders of the Pakistan Movement
Indian Shia Muslims
Pakistani emigrants to the United Kingdom
Naturalised citizens of the United Kingdom
Pakistani Shia Muslims
People from Sitapur district
Pakistani expatriates in Iraq
Poets in British India
Burials in Mashhad
Burials at Imam Reza Shrine